Gary Roger Rydstrom (born June 29, 1959) is an American sound designer and film director. He has been nominated for 20 Academy Awards for his work in sound for movies, winning 7.

Life and career
Rydstrom was born in Chicago. He graduated from the University of Southern California School of Cinematic Arts in 1981.<ref name=USCalum>Notable Alumni , USC School of Cinematic Arts, Accessed August 10, 2008.</ref> He began his career at Skywalker Sound, Northern California in 1983. Offered the job by a college professor, he received the opportunity to work with his mentor, Star Wars sound designer Ben Burtt.

After gaining invaluable experience as a sound technician in Indiana Jones and the Temple of Doom, Rydstrom went on to do sound design for the comedy Spaceballs. The sound design for Backdraft, prepared from scratch, would become the precursor for his sound for Terminator 2: Judgment Day. The original sound effects from Backdraft are constantly referenced and have been used for numerous other films including The Lord of the Rings film trilogy and Shrek.

He won an Academy Award for his work on Terminator 2: Judgment Day, for which he pioneered techniques still used today for creating realistic sound effects. Rydstrom also worked with Terminator 2 director James Cameron on a new 5.1 surround mix for the original Terminator.His sound work on Jurassic Park led to further innovations, as he and his team set out to create dinosaur sounds by mixing together numerous different animal vocalizations to make the audience feel as though giant bellowing prehistoric beasts surrounded them. The Oscar-winning film was the first motion picture to be presented in DTS. The T.rex roar created by Gary was later reused for Dim in A Bug's Life, Thanator in Avatar and the Hydra in Percy Jackson and the Lightning Thief.

He subsequently went on to work on sound for numerous films including Titanic, Saving Private Ryan, Minority Report and Finding Nemo. He won an MPSE lifetime achievement award, and regularly speaks at various sound design forums sharing his extensive knowledge and enthusiasm with aspiring sound design artists.

He made his directorial debut with the Pixar short Lifted, for which he received his fourteenth Academy Award nomination. It was included in the Animation Show of Shows in 2006. His debut feature film for the studio, Newt, which was supposed to be about the adventure of two blue-footed newts, and their struggles to work together, was announced in 2008. It supposedly reached the early stages of production, until it was cancelled by Pixar in early 2011 due to story issues. He has also directed the Pixar short Hawaiian Vacation and the Lucasfilm animated feature Strange Magic.

Rydstrom has also served as English language director on Tales From Earthsea, Arrietty, From Up on Poppy Hill, and The Wind Rises, all of which were produced by the Japanese animation company Studio Ghibli.

Awards and nominations
Gary Rydstrom has been nominated for 20 Academy Awards (7 wins), 12 Golden Reel Awards (5 wins), 5 C.A.S Awards (2 wins), 5 BAFTA Awards (2 wins), and 1 Grammy (1 win).

Filmography
 Indiana Jones and the Temple of Doom (1984) audio technician
 Ewoks: The Battle for Endor (1985) audio technician
 Remo Williams: The Adventure Begins (1985) foley
 Luxo Jr. (1986) sound designer
 Red's Dream (1987) sound designer
 Spaceballs (1987) sound designer
 Colors (1987) sound designer
 Captain EO (1987) sound designer
 Tin Toy (1988) sound designer
 Willow (1988) foley
 Always (1989) re-recording mixer
 Knick Knack (1989) sound designer
 The Neon Empire (1989) re-recording mixer
 Mars Navigator (1990) sound design/re-recording mixer (interactive video)
 F/X2 The Deadly Art Of Illusion (1991) sound design/re-recording mixer
 Backdraft (1991) sound designer/re-recording mixer
 Terminator 2: Judgment Day (1991) sound designer/re-recording mixer
 Single White Female (1992) sound designer/re-recording mixer
 Mrs. Doubtfire (1993) sound designer/re-recording mixer
 Jurassic Park (1993) sound designer/re-recording mixer (with Gary Summers and Shawn Murphy)
 Baby's Day Out (1994) sound designer/re-recording mixer
 Casper (1995) sound designer
 Strange Days (1995) sound designer/re-recording mixer
 Toy Story (1995) sound designer/re-recording mixer
 Jumanji (1995) sound designer
 James and the Giant Peach  (1996) sound designer/re-recording mixer
 Mission: Impossible (1996) re-recording mixer
 The Lost World: Jurassic Park (1997) sound designer/re-recording mixer (with Gary Summers and Shawn Murphy)
 Hercules (1997) re-recording mixer/sound designer
 Titanic (1997) sound designer (uncredited)/re-recording mixer
 Saving Private Ryan (1998) sound designer/re-recording mixer
 A Bug's Life (1998) sound designer/re-recording mixer
 Star Wars: Episode I – The Phantom Menace (1999) sound designer (uncredited)/re-recording mixer
 Toy Story 2 (1999) sound designer/re-recording mixer
 The Terminator (1984, 2000s DVD release) sound designer consultant: sound restoration and re-mixing
 102 Dalmatians (2000) sound designer consultant/re-recording mixer
 Into the Arms of Strangers: Stories of the Kindertransport (2000) sound designer/re-recording mixer
 Atlantis: The Lost Empire (2001) sound designer/re-recording mixer/supervising sound editor
 Monsters, Inc. (2001) sound designer/re-recording mixer
 Star Wars: Episode II - Attack of the Clones sound designer (uncredited)/re-recording mixer
 Minority Report (2002) sound design consultant/re-recording mixer
 Punch-Drunk Love (2002) sound designer consultant/re-recording mixer
 Finding Nemo (2003) sound designer/re-recording mixer/supervising sound editor
 Hulk (2003) sound designer/re-recording mixer
 Peter Pan (2003) sound designer/re-recording mixer/supervising sound editor
 Starship Troopers 2: Hero of the Federation (2004) special thanks
 Lifted (2006) director/writer/sound
 Tales from Earthsea (2010) director/ADR director (English-language version)
 Hawaiian Vacation (2011) director, screenplay
 Bully (2011) sound designer
 Super 8 (2011) additional sound designer
 The Adventures of Tintin (2011) sound designer consultant
 Mission: Impossible – Ghost Protocol (2011) sound designer/re-recording mixer
 War Horse (2011) sound designer/re-recording mixer/supervising sound editor
 From Up on Poppy Hill (2011) voice director
 The Secret World of Arrietty (2012) director (American English-language version)
 Brave (2012) sound designer/re-recording mixer
 Wreck-it Ralph (2012) sound designer
 From Up on Poppy Hill (2013) director (English-language version)
 The Wind Rises (2014) director (English-language version)
 The Face of Love (2013) sound designer consultant
 Strange Magic (2015) director, screenplay
 Tomorrowland (2015) sound designer/re-recording mixer
 Jurassic World (2015) sound designer/re-recording mixer (uncredited)
 Star Wars: The Force Awakens (2015) sound designer (uncredited)/re-recording mixer
 The BFG (2016) re-recording mixer
 The Post (2017) sound designer/re-recording mixer
 Ready Player One (2018) sound designer/re-recording mixer
 Ralph Breaks the Internet (2018) sound designer
 Ad Astra (2019) re-recording mixer
 Come Away (2020) re-recording mixer
 West Side Story (2021) sound designer/re-recording mixer
 The Fabelmans'' (2022) sound designer/re-recording mixer

References

External links
 Gary Rydstorm - Skywalker Sound
 

1959 births
Living people
American animated film directors
American people of Swedish descent
Best Sound Mixing Academy Award winners
Best Sound BAFTA Award winners
American audio engineers
American sound designers
USC School of Cinematic Arts alumni
Best Sound Editing Academy Award winners
American sound editors
American voice directors
CAS Career Achievement Award honorees
Artists from Chicago
Artists from Los Angeles
Film directors from California
Film directors from Illinois
Film directors from Los Angeles
Disney people
Pixar people
Walt Disney Animation Studios people
Lucasfilm people
Grammy Award winners